Akola is a town in the Agra district of Uttar Pradesh, India, about 16 km from the district's main city of Agra. It is one of the 15 development block of Agra.

An Indian Air Force drop zone known widely for its large area is about 5 km away from the town. It has a sub-post office, covering many of the nearby villages.

Akola is known for its wrestlers all over the state and its youth's obsession with sports and joining armed forces. Akola is prominently known as Chaharwati 

Notable persons are Late Shri Ramnarayan mukhiya ji who contributed his land in the establishment of degree college in Akola.

Pradhahan( akola gram panchayat) - Shreemati Pooja Devi W/O  Dr Gambhir singh chahar.

References 

Cities and towns in Agra district